79th Street (Chatham) is an electrified commuter rail station along the Metra Electric Main Line in the Chatham neighborhood of Chicago, Illinois.

East of this station is another Metra Electric station along 79th Street known as Cheltenham-79th Street along the South Chicago Branch. Like much of the main branch of the Metra Electric line, 79th Street-Chatham is built on elevated tracks near the embankment of a bridge over 79th Street. This bridge also carries the Amtrak line that runs parallel to it, carrying the City of New Orleans, Illini, and Saluki trains. Parking is available only on the southwest corner of 79th Street and Woodlawn Avenue.

The former Nickel Plate Railroad passed on a long bridge over the Illinois Central (the current tracks) just north of the station. The bridge still exists, but rail service is long gone.

Bus connections
CTA
  79 79th (Owl Service)

References

External links 

79th Street Chatham
Former Illinois Central Railroad stations